Berberis amoena is a shrub native to the Sichuan and Yunnan provinces of China. It is found at elevations of 1600–3100 m.

The species was initially described in 1905 and given the name Berberis elegans. It was later discovered that this name had already been used twice before, so the plant was renamed Berberis amoena in 1911.

Berberis amoena is a deciduous shrub up to 100 cm tall, with spines up to 12 mm long along the smaller branches. Leaves are elliptical, up to 16 mm long. Flowers are borne in groups of 4-8. Berries are red and oblong, growing up to 6 mm long.

References

amoena
Flora of Yunnan
Flora of Sichuan
Plants described in 1905